is a former Japanese football player.

Playing career
Konno was born in Ofunato on September 12, 1974. After graduating from Kokushikan University, he joined J1 League club Júbilo Iwata in 1997. Although he played as right side back not only his original position offensive midfielder, he could hardly play in the match in the club which many Japan national team players played. In 2000, he moved to newly was promoted to J1 League club, Kawasaki Frontale. He played many matches as offensive midfielder and the club won the 2nd place 2000 J.League Cup. However the club results were bad in league competition and was relegated to J2 League from 2001. From 2001, he played many matches as central player and the club won the champions in 2004 and was promoted to J1 from 2005. However his opportunity to play decreased from 2005 and he retired end of 2006 season.

Club statistics

References

External links

orions.ne.jp

1974 births
Living people
Kokushikan University alumni
Association football people from Iwate Prefecture
Japanese footballers
J1 League players
J2 League players
Júbilo Iwata players
Kawasaki Frontale players
Association football midfielders